Ignacio Noé (born January 27, 1965, Escobar, Buenos Aires Province), usually known simply as Noé, is an artist in a wide range of graphic genres, working in comics, children's books, magazine illustration and erotic comics, in a highly rendered style that utilizes both digital and traditional media. His works include "The Piano Tuner", "Ship of Fools" and most notably "The Convent of Hell".

Noé also gives painting workshops geared towards the field of illustration.

Bibliography (English editions of adult stories)
 The Convent of Hell (El Convento Infernal, Kiss Comix, 1996, with writer Ricardo Barreiro), New York City: NBM Publishing (1998). .
 Doctor, I´m Too Big (Diet, Kiss Comix, 1997). New York: NBM Publishing (1998). .
 Ship Of Fools (La Nave De Los Locos, Kiss Comix, 1998). New York: NBM Publishing (1999). .
 The Piano Tuner (El Afinador, Kiss Comix, 2001). New York: NBM Publishing (2003). .
 The Piano Tuner, Vol. 2 (El Afinador, Kiss Comix, 2003). New York: NBM Publishing (2009). .
 Pin-Up Artist (Exposición, Kiss Comix, 2005). New York: NBM Publishing (2011). .
 Aldana (Aldana, Kiss Comix, 2006). New York: NBM Publishing (2009). .

External links
 Ignacio Noé's official site (English version)
 Eroticcomic.info's listing of Kiss Comix (German)

1965 births
Living people
Argentine comics artists
Argentine comics writers
Argentine erotic artists
People from Escobar Partido